Panemunė is a neighborhood in the second-largest Lithuanian city of Kaunas. It was formally incorporated into Kaunas in 1931, and located on the left bank of the Nemunas River. It occupies  with 22,140 inhabitants. The Panemunė elderate encompasses the neighbourhoods of Vaišvydava, Vičiūnai, Panemunė, and Rokai.

A vast pine woods occupies a significant area in this neighbourhood. Neorenaissance style Holy Virgin Mary church built in the middle of the 19th century is located in Panemunė elderate.

Prior to World War II, Panemunė contained a significant community of Jews. Borough also has characteristics of resort town since 1930s, and has rehabilitation centers and elderly home in the pine woods of the neighborhood.

Eldership of Panemunė 
The first school in Panemunė was established in 1877. On the 7 July 1995, Kauno Panemunės Primary Lithuanian School has been established. In 1998, it was renamed to Kauno Vaidoto Primary School.

New Panemunės School was opened in 1963. In 1998, Kaunas 13th School was awarded the name of a famous adventurer, writer, pedagogue Matas Šalčius. In 2005, it was rebranded into a catholic school and went by the name of St. Matthew. In the end of 2011, it was decided that the school will be privatized. In 2012, the High School of St. Matthew was redesigned into a non-governmental institution and its founder was the Vilkaviškis diocese.

In 1991, two kindergartens-nurseries were redesigned to Kauno Panemunės primary school-kindergarten. In 1992, the school-kindergarten was reorganized into Kauno Panemunės primary school.

In 1993, in High Panemunė, a new school has been established that was called Kauno Šilo Primary School. Since the establishment of said school, all educational, expression of creativity and spiritual development were based on Lithuanian values, virtues and heritage.

In 1987, a social care institution was established, the Kauno Panemunės Retirement Home, which was dedicated to seniors that were of retirement age that require constant care.

Also, Panemunė hosts Kaunas Municipality's Child Care Home and in 1952, a very fine library was established in Panemunė.

1859–1860, the Panemunė Cemetery has been established and many famous people like Aleksandras Stulginskis are buried there.

Panemunė's first airport was built around 1912–1913 and some hangars still remain there to this day. Around 1927–1928, the reinforced concrete bridge that connects Šančiai and Panemunė was built. There is the pride of Panemunė, the Panemunės šilas park. There are many paths to take there, that are named after various animals and birds. There is also a significant amount of resting and exercising zones.

References

External links
 
 Website of Kaunas city
 Official Panemunė elderate webpage 
 Poniemoń (2.) (Panemunė) in the Geographical Dictionary of the Kingdom of Poland (1887) 
Jewish Families and Individuals in Panemune 1780s-1940s

Neighbourhoods of Kaunas